Peter Ho (born September 13, 1975) is an American-Hong Kong-Taiwanese singer, actor and model based in Hong Kong and Taiwan. Since his debut in 1998, he has released seven albums and has starred in over 25 films and television series, most notably Crouching Tiger, Hidden Dragon,  Wind and Cloud, One Meter Sunshine, Goddess of Mercy, The Young Warriors, Three Kingdoms, King's War, Summer's Desire, and Nothing Gold Can Stay.

Ho also appeared in the 2003 tokusatsu film Kamen Rider 555: Paradise Lost as Leo/Kamen Rider Psyga; becoming the first non-Japanese Kamen Rider. Ho is also known for his role in the wuxia film  Sword Master.

Biography
Ho was born in Los Angeles, California, United States, but was raised in Taiwan and Canada. His parents are from Hong Kong. He studied at Ontario College of Art and Design, and began his singing career after being offered a record deal in a karaoke bar. In 1998, he released his debut album Miss You Love in Taiwan. 
Ho married his non-celebrity girlfriend in 2016.

Filmography

Film

Television series

Discography

Albums

Singles

Awards and nominations

References

1975 births
Living people
American people of Taiwanese descent
Taiwanese male film actors
Taiwanese male singers
Taiwanese male television actors
Male actors from Los Angeles
Taiwanese Mandopop singers
Singers from Los Angeles
20th-century Taiwanese male actors
21st-century Taiwanese male actors
Taiwanese television producers
21st-century Canadian male singers
Cantonese-language_singers_of_Taiwan
American born Hong Kong artists